Voltunteers is the eighth full-length studio album by British post-punk band, Spear of Destiny. The album features a re-recording of "Never Take Me Alive", the band's highest-placing single.

Track listing 
All tracks composed by Kirk Brandon
"Some Kind of Normal" - 4:40
"Nothing Under the Sun" - 4:44
"Silver Forest" - 4:14
"Volunteers" - 1:18
"Paranoia" - 3:26
"Judas" - 5:25
"Never Take Me Alive" - 4:27
"Uphill Backwards" - 4:59
"Penny Black" - 3:56
"Iceman" - 4:15
"End of Days" - 7:53

Personnel
Spear of Destiny
Kirk Brandon - vocals, guitar
John McNutt - guitar 
James Yardley - bass 
Art Smith - drums

References

2001 albums
Spear of Destiny (band) albums